Eora is a name given to a group of Aboriginal Australian people by the early settlers of what is now New South Wales.

Eora may also refer to:
Eora Centre for the Visual and Performing Arts, Sydney, now part of TAFE NSW, formerly often referred to as simply Eora
 Eora Creek, Papua New Guinea
Eora language, former name for the Dharug language